Prunus umbellata, called flatwoods plum, hog plum and sloe plum, is a plum species native to the United States from Virginia, south to Florida, and west to Texas.

Prunus umbellata can reach  in height with a  spread. It has alternate serrate green leaves that turn yellow in autumn. Flowers are white, creamy, or grayish. The trees bloom and bear fruit later than other plums. The fruits mature August–October. Large crops appear only every 3–4 years.

P. umbellata trees can live up to 40 years and are very difficult to distinguish from P. angustifolia, with which it hybridizes easily.

The fruits are made into jellies and jams.

Gallery

References

External links 
 
 
 

umbellata
Flora of the Southern United States
Plants described in 1821
umbellata